Cryptomeigenia elegans is a fly species in the family Tachinidae.

Distribution
Mexico.

References

External links 
 Cryptomeigenia elegans at insectoid.info

Exoristinae
Insects described in 1890
Insects of Mexico
Diptera of North America
Taxa named by Frederik Maurits van der Wulp